May Thu Kyaw (born 10 November 1995) is a Burmese footballer who plays as a forward for the Myanmar women's national team.

International career
May Thu Kyaw represented Myanmar at the 2011 AFC U-16 Women's Championship and the 2013 AFC U-19 Women's Championship. She capped at senior level during the 2014 AFC Women's Asian Cup and the 2018 AFC Women's Asian Cup qualification.

International goals
Scores and results list Myanmar's goal tally first.

See also
List of Myanmar women's international footballers

References

1995 births
Living people
Women's association football forwards
Burmese women's footballers
Sportspeople from Yangon
Myanmar women's international footballers